Kenneth Carter (born December 2, 1967) is a former head football coach of Delaware State University, in Dover, Delaware. Carter was formally announced as the head coach of the Hornets on January 21, 2015 and succeeded Kermit Blount at the position. Carter's three-year contract was not renewed in 2017.

Head coaching record

References

1967 births
Living people
American football linebackers
Delaware State Hornets football coaches
Florida Gators football coaches
Furman Paladins football coaches
Louisville Cardinals football coaches
LSU Tigers football coaches
Penn State Nittany Lions football coaches
Pittsburgh Panthers football coaches
The Citadel Bulldogs football coaches
The Citadel Bulldogs football players
Vanderbilt Commodores football coaches
Youngstown State Penguins football coaches
African-American coaches of American football
African-American players of American football
20th-century African-American sportspeople
21st-century African-American sportspeople